The 2019–20 Fordham Rams men's basketball team represents Fordham University during the 2019–20 NCAA Division I men's basketball season. The Rams, led by fifth-year head coach Jeff Neubauer, play their home games at Rose Hill Gymnasium in The Bronx, New York as a member of the Atlantic 10 Conference.

Previous season
The Rams finished the 2018–19 season 12–20, 3–15 in A-10 play to finish in last place. They lost in the first round of the A-10 tournament to Richmond.

Departures

Incoming transfers

2019 recruiting class

Roster

Schedule and results

|-
!colspan=9 style=| Exhibition
 
|-
!colspan=9 style=| Non-conference regular season

|-
!colspan=9 style=| Atlantic 10 regular season

 

|-
!colspan=9 style=| Atlantic 10 tournament

Source

See also
 2019–20 Fordham Rams women's basketball team

References

Fordham
Fordham Rams men's basketball seasons
Fordham
Fordham